This is a list of Spanish football transfers for the January sale in the 2010–11 season of La Liga and Segunda División. Only moves from La Liga and Segunda División are listed.

The winter transfer window opened on 1 January 2011, although a few transfers took place prior to that date. The window closed at midnight on 1 February 2011. Players without a club could have joined one at any time, either during or in between transfer windows. Clubs below La Liga level could also have signed players on loan at any time. If need be, clubs could have signed a goalkeeper on an emergency loan, if all others were unavailable.

List of Transfers

See also
List of Spanish football transfers summer 2010

References

Transfers Winter 2010-11
Football transfers winter 2010–11
2010-11